Thune is a light rail station on the Oslo Tramway.

Located at Skøyen, it was opened by Kristiania Elektriske Sporvei as an extension of the Skøyen Line 1901. It is served by line 13. It is currently located between Skøyen and Nobels gate.

The station used to serve the now-defunct locomotive factory Thunes Mekaniske Værksted. The car outlet Møller Skøyen is also nearby.

References

Oslo Tramway stations in Oslo
Railway stations opened in 1901
1901 establishments in Norway